is a Japanese film director and screenwriter. He made his directorial debut with To Sleep so as to Dream (1986). He is best known for his neo-noir Maiku Hama trilogy, The Most Terrible Time in My Life (1994), Stairway to the Distant Past (1995) and The Trap (1996). In addition to film, Hayashi served as creative director on the 2000 Konami video game 7 Blades for the PlayStation 2, and was director for two episodes of Power Rangers: Time Force.

Partial filmography
 
 
 
 
 Zipang (1990)
 
 
 
 
 
 Cat's Eye (1997)
 Bolt (2020)

References

External links
 
 

1957 births
Living people
People from Kyoto Prefecture
Japanese film directors
Japanese screenwriters
Writers from Kyoto Prefecture